Simms Creek is a stream in St. Clair County in the U.S. state of Missouri. It is a tributary of the Osage River.

A variant name was "Sims Creek". The stream bears the name of a pioneer citizen.

References

Rivers of St. Clair County, Missouri
Rivers of Missouri